Colmar - Houssen Airport  is an airport in Houssen,  north of Colmar, both communes in the Haut-Rhin department of the Alsace region in France. The airport is along Autoroute A35 and is served by the Colmar Station.

Facilities

Statistics

References

External links
 A History of Colmar Airport

 Colmar Airport
 Colmar Airport 
 

Airports in Grand Est
Haut-Rhin
Colmar